Next Friday (Original Motion Picture Soundtrack) is the soundtrack album to Steve Carr's 2000 comedy film Next Friday. It was released on December 14, 1999 through Warner Sunset Records and Atlantic Records and consisted of hip hop and R&B music.

Recording sessions took place at The Hit Factory, Sony Music Studios and 36 Chambers Studio in New York, at Encore Studios in Burbank, at Noontime Studios in Atlanta, at Backroom Studios in Glendale, at Record One and The Village Recorder in Los Angeles, at Ruthless Records Recording Studio, and at Fred's Tilt. Production was handled by Angela Winbush, Baby Paul, Bass Brothers, Dat Nigga Reb, Diggie Doms, Donald "One Eye" Saunders, Donnie Scantz, Dr. Dre, Fredwreck, Irv Gotti, Jerry Duplessis, Jimmy "JT" Thomas, Kenny Jones, Mannie Fresh, Mathematics, Super Sako, Teddy Bishop, Vachik Aghaniats and Wyclef Jean, with compilation producer Ice Cube and executive producers Andrew Shack, Lori Silfen, Mark Kaufman, Mitch Rotter, Paul Broucek and Toby Emmerich.

It features appearances from Mack 10, Aaliyah, Big Tymers, Bizzy Bone, Don Cisco, Eminem, Ja Rule, Kid Frost, Krayzie Bone, Kurupt, Lil' Wayne, Lil' Zane, Lyric, Ms. Toi, Pharoahe Monch, Sam Dates, Soopafly, The Isley Brothers, Toni Estes, Vita, Wu-Tang Clan, Wyclef Jean, and the reunited N.W.A with Snoop Dogg as a one-time member.

The soundtrack reached number 19 on the Billboard 200 and number 5 on the Top R&B/Hip-Hop Albums chart in the United States. It was certified gold by the Recording Industry Association of America on July 11, 2000 for selling 500,000 units. It also spawned six singles: Ice Cube's "You Can Do It", Lil' Zane's "Money Stretch", Aaliyah's "I Don't Wanna", Wyclef Jean's "Low Income", N.W.A.'s "Chin Check" and Toni Estes's "Hot".

Track listing

Sample credits
 Track 1 contains a sample from "Planet Rock" as recorded by Afrika Bambaataa and the Soulsonic Force
 Track 3 contains samples from "Somebody Is Gonna Off the Man" as performed by Barry White
 Track 6 contains interpolations from "1st of tha Month"
 Track 9 contains excerpts from "Knuckleheadz" as performed by Raekwon
 Track 11 contains interpolations from "Saturday Love"
 Track 15 contains elements from "Glad to Know You're Mine" as performed by Ohio Players

Other songs
The following songs did appear in the film but were not released on the soundtrack: 
 "Chase Me" written by Michael Vernon Cooper and Felton Pilate and performed by Con Funk Shun
 "You Dropped a Bomb on Me" written by Lonnie Simmons, Rudy Taylor and Charlie Wilson and performed by The Gap Band
 "Bad Luck" written by Victor Carstarphen, Gene McFadden and John Whitehead and performed by Harold Melvin & the Blue Notes
 "Tell Me Something Good" written by Stevie Wonder and performed by Rufus & Chaka Khan
 "Tyrone" written by Erykah Badu and Norman 'Keys' Hurt
 "Juicy Fruit" written by James Mtume and performed by Mtume
 "Rigor Mortis" written by Larry Blackmon, Arnett Leftenant and Nathan Leftenant and performed by Cameo
 "In the Mood" written by Paul Richmond, Ruben Locke and Darryl Ellis and performed by Tyrone Davis
 "Good Times" written by Dave Grusin, Alan and Marilyn Bergman
 "Riding High" written by Keith D. Harrison, Tyrone Crum, Ralph E. Atkens, Roger Parker, Robert Neal Jr. and Clarence Satchell and performed by Faze-O
 "Sex-O-Matic Venus Freak" written by Dion Murdock, Macy Gray and Jeremy Ruzumna and performed by Macy Gray
 "Don't Stop the Feeling" written and performed by Roy Ayers
 "Fame" written by David Bowie, John Lennon and Carlos Alomar and performed by David Bowie
 "Let It Whip" written by Reggie Andrews and Leon Chancler and performed by Dazz Band
 "Funky Worm" written by Marvin Pierce, Gregory A. Webster, Norman Napier, Ralph Middlebrooks, Leroy Bonner, Marshall E. Jones, Andrew Noland and Walter Morrison and performed by Ohio Players
 "Jungle Fever" written by Bill Ador and performed by The Chakachas
 "Can I Get A..." written by Jeffrey Atkins, Shawn Carter, Irving Lorenzo and Rob Mays
 "Sinsemilla" written by Michael Rose and performed by Black Uhuru
 "Friends" written by Jalil Hutchins and Lawrence Smith
 "Movin' on Up (Theme from The Jeffersons)" written by Ja'Net DuBois and Jeff Barry

Charts

Weekly charts

Year-end charts

Certifications

References

External links

Hip hop soundtracks
1999 soundtrack albums
Friday (franchise) music
Albums produced by Dr. Dre
1990s film soundtrack albums
Albums produced by Fredwreck
Albums produced by Irv Gotti
Contemporary R&B soundtracks
Atlantic Records soundtracks
Albums produced by Mathematics
Albums produced by Mannie Fresh
Albums produced by Angela Winbush
Albums produced by Jerry Duplessis
Albums produced by Wyclef Jean